is a passenger railway station in the city of Naka, Ibaraki Prefecture, operated by East Japan Railway Company (JR East).

Lines
Minami-Sakaide Station is served by the Hitachi-Ōta Spur Line of the Suigun Line, and is located 2.5 rail kilometers from the official starting point of the spur line at Kami-Sugaya Station.

Station layout
The station has a single side platform serving traffic in both directions. There is no station building, and the station is unattended.

History
Operations were suspended from August 10, 1941 to February 1, 1953 when the station was renamed to its present name. The station was absorbed into the JR East network upon the privatization of the Japanese National Railways (JNR) on April 1, 1987.

Surrounding area

See also
List of railway stations in Japan

External links

  JR East Station information 

Railway stations in Ibaraki Prefecture
Suigun Line
Railway stations in Japan opened in 1935
Naka, Ibaraki